Tales from Jabba's Palace is an anthology of short stories set in the fictional Star Wars universe. The book was edited by Kevin J. Anderson and published on December 1, 1995 by Bantam Spectra.

Contents 
 Introduction
 "A Boy and His Monster: The Rancor Keeper's Tale" by Kevin J. Anderson
 "Taster's Choice: The Tale of Jabba's Chef" by Barbara Hambly
 "That's Entertainment: The Tale of Salacious Crumb" by Esther M. Friesner
 "A Time to Mourn, a Time to Dance: Oola's Tale" by Kathy Tyers
 "Let Us Prey: The Whiphid's Tale" by Marina Fitch and Mark Budz
 "Sleight of Hand: The Tale of Mara Jade" by Timothy Zahn
 "And Then There Were Some: The Gamorrean Guard's Tale" by William F. Wu
 "Old Friends: Ephant Mon's Tale" by Kenneth C. Flint
 "Goatgrass: The Tale of Ree-Yees" by Deborah Wheeler
 "And the Band Played On: The Band's Tale" by John Gregory Betancourt
 "Of the Day's Annoyances: Bib Fortuna's Tale" by M. Shayne Bell
 "The Great God Quay: The Tale of Barada and the Weequays" by George Alec Effinger
 "A Bad Feeling: The Tale of EV-9D9" by Judith and Garfield Reeves-Stevens
 "A Free Quarren in the Palace: Tessek's Tale" by Dave Wolverton
 "Tongue-tied: Bubo's Tale" by Daryl F. Mallett
 "Out of the Closet: The Assassin's Tale" by Jennifer Roberson
 "Shaara and the Sarlacc: The Skiff Guard's Tale" by Dan'l Danehy-Oakes
 "A Barve Like That: The Tale of Boba Fett" by Daniel Keys Moran (under the pseudonym J.D. Montgomery)
 "Skin Deep: The Fat Dancer's Tale" by A. C. Crispin
 Epilogue: Whatever Became Of...?

A Barve Like That: The Tale of Boba Fett
Daniel Keys Moran released the story under the pseudonym J.D. Montgomery, after creative differences with Lucasfilm prevented him from writing the outline he envisioned. He planned to have Boba Fett spend years in the sarlacc, but was told he could only be there for a couple of days. He also wanted the sarlacc to demonstrate intelligence, but had to give the role to one of Fett's fellow captives, Susejo ("O Jesus" spelled backwards).

The sequel to the compilation, Tales of the Bounty Hunters, also featured a story subtitled "The Tale of Boba Fett", also by Moran.

See also
 Tales from the Mos Eisley Cantina

References

External links

1995 anthologies
Science fiction anthologies
Star Wars Legends
Works edited by Kevin J. Anderson
1990s science fiction works
Bantam Spectra books